The Captain of the Parish is an official in each parish in the Isle of Man—formerly the title was Captain of the Parish Militia, but it is now only a titular honour. Historically the Captain of the Parish was authorised to raise his own militia in his parish and had the duty to light beacons informing the parish of an invasion.

A Captain of the Parish is referred to by the prenominal title Captain (e.g. Captain Charles Fargher). A person may hold the Captaincy of more than one parish at any one time. The title is held until death, unless it is removed for bad conduct, which has not occurred for many centuries.

One remaining function of the Captain of the Parish is in connection with requisition meetings during Keys elections. A requisition meeting can be held following the close of nominations, provided a formal request is made in writing by registered electors to the Captain of the Parish or the local authority, who will then invite all candidates to address the voters at a requisition meeting and answer their questions. This is now somewhat more complicated as a number of the new Keys constituency boundaries do not coincide with the boundaries of the traditional parishes, and there was some debate, during the oral evidence to the Select Committee of Tynwald on the Organisation and Operation of the General Election 2016, about the role of the Captains of Parishes in connection with calling these meetings.

Although Onchan and Michael are now Districts for local authority purposes, the districts are also ancient parishes and so they still have Captains of the Parish.

The equivalent title for towns is Captain of the Town; however this title is no longer used.  The town areas of the Isle of Man are:
 Ramsey
 Douglas
 Castletown
 Peel

See also
State Officials of the Isle of Man

References

External links
 Captains of the Parishes History of the Captains of the Parishes and details of the current Captains.

 
Government of the Isle of Man